Claire Skinner (born 1965) is an English actress, known in the United Kingdom for her television career, particularly playing Sue Brockman from the BBC television series Outnumbered.

Early life
Claire Skinner was born and brought up in Hemel Hempstead, the youngest daughter of a shopkeeper and an Irish-born secretary, and was shy as a child. Her dream was to be an actress and she immersed herself in her ambition. She acted, neglecting school work at Cavendish School, and "barely scraped through [her] A-levels". She went on to study at the London Academy of Music and Dramatic Art and then joined the Royal Shakespeare Company.

Career
Her first role was in Hanky Park, by Walter Greenwood at the Oldham Repertory Theatre, which she describes as a "really traditional start". She is best known as Clare on the British television comedy Life Begins and as Lucinda, the sous chef in the first series of Chef! alongside Lenny Henry. From 2007 to 2014, she portrayed Sue Brockman in the sitcom Outnumbered. For many years, she has preferred theatre to screen roles because she has been disappointed with her TV projects ("apart from Mike Leigh's stuff"), "not just when you see the final thing, but also because it hasn't taken off."

Skinner has worked with directors including Mike Leigh – in Life Is Sweet, and Naked – Trevor Nunn, Tim Burton and Sam Mendes, but according to her, Alan Ayckbourn "was a great influence for me as he pushed me so hard, but every director you work with has a big influence in some way, they really push you."

She has made appearances in TV shows such as Lark Rise to Candleford where for two episodes she played Mrs Macey. She appeared in the 2011 Doctor Who Christmas special "The Doctor, the Widow and the Wardrobe".

In 2019, she played Sheila in A Day in the Death of Joe Egg, which ran in Trafalgar Studios in the West End from September to November.

Personal life
She has two sons with director Charles Palmer; William John (born 1999) and Thomas Henry (born 2002). Their marriage ended in 2016. She is in a relationship with Outnumbered co-star Hugh Dennis.

Filmography

Film

Television

Theatre

The Playboy of the Western World by J. M. Synge
The Revengers' Comedies by Alan Ayckbourn, Stephen Joseph Theatre, (1989)
Taking Steps-Revival by Alan Ayckbourn, Stephen Joseph Theatre, (1990)
Invisible Friends by Alan Ayckbourn, Cottlesloe Theatre, National Theatre, (1991)
Measure for Measure by William Shakespeare, Young Vic Theatre, Royal Shakespeare Company, (1992)
The Importance of Being Earnest by Oscar Wilde, (1993)
Moonlight, by Harold Pinter, London's West End, (1993)
Look Back in Anger, by John Osborne, Royal Exchange, Manchester, (1995)
Charley's Aunt, by Brandon Thomas, Royal Exchange, Manchester,  (1995)
The Glass Menagerie, by Tennessee Williams, Donmar Warehouse and Comedy Theatre, (1995)
Othello by William Shakespeare, Lyttelton Theatre, Royal National Theatre, (1997)
The Winter's Tale by William Shakespeare, Olivier Theatre, Royal National Theatre, (2001)
Mrs. Affleck, National Theatre, (2009)
Deathtrap by Ira Levin, Noël Coward Theatre (2010)
Blurred Lines, National Theatre, (2014) 
The Father by Florian Zeller, Theatre Royal Bath Productions, Tricycle Theatre (2015)
Rabbit Hole by David Lindsay-Abaire, Hampstead Theatre (2016)
Prism by Terry Johnson, Hampstead Theatre (2017)
Nightfall by Barney Norris, Bridge Theatre Productions, Bridge Theatre (2018)
A Day in The Death of Joe Egg by Peter Nichols, Trafalgar Studios (2019)

Radio

Five Beats to the Bar by Neil d'Souza, BBC Radio 4, (2002)
Old Harry's Game—Christmas Special by Andy Hamilton on BBC Radio 4, (2002)
Trevor's World of Sport by Andy Hamilton on BBC Radio 4, (2005, 2006, 2007)
Oblomov (2005)
The Light of Knowledge by Mya Hnuang Nyo, BBC Radio 4, (2005)
Measure for Measure by William Shakespeare, BBC Radio 4, (2005)
Bed and Breakfast by Helen Simpson, BBC Radio 4, (2005)
Not a Games Person, narrating Julie Myerson's play, BBC Radio 4, (2006)
Sculptor's Daughter-Christmas, Snow, Pets and Females, and The Bays by Tove Jansson, BBC Radio 4, (2006)
Standing Sideways, by Matt Charman, BBC Radio 4, (2006)
Elizabeth and Her German Garden, by Elizabeth von Arnim, BBC Radio 4, (2006)
School Runs, by Alexis Zegerman, BBC Radio 4, (2006)
Jigsaw, by Sybille Bedford, BBC Radio 4, (2006, 2007)
 Poetry Please, reading poems by Percy Bysshe, Mary Shelley, John Donne, Gerard Manley Hopkins, Thomas Hardy, Philip Larkin, BBC Radio 4, (2007)
Mrs. Warren's Profession, by George Bernard Shaw, BBC Radio 3, (2007)
Bird Song BBC Radio 3, (2008)
Don't Turn Around (radio short) by Marian Garvey, BBC Radio 4, (2008)
Five Easy Ways with Chilli by Scarlett Thomas, BBC Radio 4, (2008)
Lunch: A Platonic Romantic Comedy by Marcy Kahan, BBC Radio 4, (2013, 2014, 2015)
The Father by Florian Zeller, BBC Radio 3, (2017)

Awards
1992 – Won – Geneva Stars de Demain Best Actress for Life Is Sweet
1995 – Won – Critics' Circle Theatre Award Best Actress for The Glass Menagerie
1995 – Won – Time Out Award for Best Performance Off West End for The Glass Menagerie
1996 – Nominated – Laurence Olivier Award Best Supporting Performance for The Glass Menagerie
2009 – Nominated – BAFTA Best Comedy Performance for Outnumbered

References

External links

1965 births
Living people
People from Hemel Hempstead
Alumni of the London Academy of Music and Dramatic Art
Critics' Circle Theatre Award winners
Royal Shakespeare Company members
English film actresses
English people of Irish descent
English radio actresses
English stage actresses
English television actresses
Date of birth missing (living people)
Actresses from Hertfordshire
20th-century English actresses
21st-century English actresses